This is a list of media in Victoria, British Columbia.

Radio

Defunct stations
 CKMO AM 900 - campus radio station owned by Camosun College; ceased operations March 4, 2012, continuing as an internet-only station.

Television
There are two local stations, two rebroadcasters, and one community channel in Victoria. Victoria is the only Canadian provincial capital without a local CBC Television or Ici Radio-Canada Télé station. The region is considered to be a part of the Vancouver television market, receiving most stations that broadcast from across the Strait of Georgia, including CBUT-DT (CBC Television), CBUFT-DT (Ici Radio-Canada Télé), CIVT-DT (CTV), CHAN-DT (Global), CKVU-DT (Citytv), CHNM-DT (Omni Television), and CHNU-DT (Joytv). As a consequence, Victoria's terrestrial television stations are either independent or associated with Canada's secondary television systems rather than with the main networks.

See Media in Vancouver for a full list of Vancouver broadcasters.

Print
Absolute Underground - underground music and culture magazine
Black Press
Boulevard Magazine
Douglas Magazine - Victoria based business magazine
Goldstream Gazette
James Bay Beacon
Lookout - CFB Esquimalt navy base newspaper
The Martlet - UVic student newspaper
Monday Magazine
The Nexus - Camosun College student newspaper
Oak Bay News
The Pacific Rim Review of Books - Victoria based book review journal
Saanich News
Senior Living - profiling the lives and achievements of the 50+ demographic living in BC
Sooke News Mirror
Times Colonist
Tweed Magazine - Oak Bay lifestyle magazine
Victoria Magazine
Victoria News
Y.A.M. - Victoria's Lifestyle Magazine

Internet
LoadingReadyRun - sketch comedy website based in Victoria

 Victoria Buzz - Southern Vancouver Island news, events and more

References

Victoria
 
Media, Victoria